Holy Names University is a private Roman Catholic university in Oakland, California.  It was founded by and remains affiliated with the Sisters of the Holy Names of Jesus and Mary. It was founded in 1868 and plans to close in 2023.

History
 The university was originally established as the Convent of Our Lady of the Sacred Heart in 1868 by six members of the Sisters of the Holy Names, a teaching order from Quebec, Canada.  They were invited to Oakland by Father Michael King, pastor of Saint Mary's Church to establish a school for girls and to provide means to train future teachers.

The original site of the convent was on the shores of Lake Merritt.  By 1908 the convent began to offer classes at a post-secondary level and was renamed the College of the Holy Names.  In 1949 the college became one of the charter members of the Western Association of Schools and Colleges (WASC). The coeducation graduate division was formally established in 1955. Soon afterward in 1957,  the original site was purchased by Henry J. Kaiser where he constructed the Kaiser Building, and the school moved to its present location in the Oakland Hills. In 1971, Holy Names became coeducational at the undergraduate level and was renamed Holy Names College. The Julia Morgan School for Girls held classes for its first two years, from 1999 through 2001, at Holy Names. The school took its present name on May 10, 2004, and became known as the "newest Catholic university in California."

In December 2022, the university announced plans to close after the spring 2023 semester. It cited "rising operational costs, declining enrollment, and an increased need for institutional aid", particularly in the aftermath of the COVID-19 pandemic and related economic downturn. It has formed a relationship with Dominican University of California to allow students to continue their studies there after Holy Names closes.

Campus
Holy Names University is located on a wooded, sixty-acre site in the Oakland Hills about 2.5 miles southeast of the Montclair district. To the north of campus lies the neighborhood of Woodminster, and the City of Oakland's 500 acre Joaquin Miller Park. To the southeast, Holy Names' campus is flanked with the Crestmont neighborhood to the east, and the Redwood Heights neighborhood is to the west across the Warren Freeway. Redwood Regional Park, part of the East Bay Regional Park District, lies about 2.2 miles east on Redwood Road.

Architecture
San Francisco Bay Area architect Milton T. Pflueger, younger brother of the renowned architect Timothy L. Pflueger, designed the mid-century modern campus buildings, which were constructed from 1955 to 1958, and dedicated in 1957.  Milton Pflueger designed many campus buildings at University of California, Berkeley and Stanford University, but Holy Names is the only complete campus he designed. The first buildings constructed included  Michael and Maureen Hester Administration, the Paul J. Cushing Library, the Tobin Gymnasium, and McLean Chapel. The hillside location inspired a linear plan, with low-roofed buildings nestled along the slope. The site features panoramic views across the San Francisco Bay from San Jose on the San Francisco Peninsula to Mount Tamalpais on the Marin Peninsula.

The Valley Center for the Performing Arts was constructed in 1994, in the former location of the tennis courts. It houses two separate theatres; large audiences up to 390 can be accommodated in the Regents’ Theatre, while smaller groups use the Studio Theatre with movable seating for up to 125 participants.

Default and Financial Problems
In 2023, it was reported that Holy Names University was facing dire financial problems and was in default on debt for its huge property holdings.

Academics
 HNU maintains small class sizes, with a student to faculty ratio of 13:1, and 90 percent of the faculty hold the highest degree in their fields. U.S. News & World Report ranked HNU as the most diverse university in the West in 2013. This same year, Holy Names University earned the highest diversity index score of all the colleges and universities included in the magazine's multiple diversity rankings.

The university offers nineteen undergraduate degree programs, and five adult degree completion programs. HNU also offers seven master's degree programs in addition to a teacher education program leading to a California teacher's credential. Graduate degrees offered include several business degree concentrations (MBA with concentrations in energy and environment, finance, management and leadership, marketing, or sports management), counseling psychology (MA), education (EdD and credentials), English (MA), music (MA), and nursing (MSN/MBA, MSN).  The university added a Master of Arts in Forensic Psychology in 2006.

Center for Social Justice and Civic Engagement
The Center for Social Justice and Civic Engagement (CSJCE) includes Service-Learning and Community-Based Leadership (CBL) programs. The CSJCE offers numerous volunteer opportunities, service projects, and dialogues through its CBL initiatives. The Holy Names University Early Admit Program (HNUEAP) is offered through the center. The CSJCE serves as an exemplary example of a strong partnership between academic and student affairs.

Through its programs and services, the CSJCE promotes leadership development for social responsibility and cultural competence. Programs and services emphasize personal and social awareness, equity and equality, justice, diversity, service, community involvement, and social activism. Students are introduced to issues such as water rights, poverty, and education for the poor, all platforms pursued by the SNJMs.

Library services
The Paul J. Cushing Library is a two-story facility with a distinctive vaulted ceiling and exceptional daylight on the main level. Its architectural design mirrors the campus chapel. The library provides the Holy Names community a full suite of electronic and traditional books and journals, as well as a wide range of gadgets and devices faculty and staff can check out. Library team members offer instruction to every department. The library regularly offers special events such as art exhibits, book talks, film showings, and lunchtime piano recitals. A popular spot for studying, the library averages more than 6,000 walk-ins per month.

Athletics

The Holy Names (HNU) athletic teams are called the Hawks. The university is a member of the Division II level of the National Collegiate Athletic Association (NCAA), primarily competing in the Pacific West Conference (PacWest) since the 2012–13 academic year. The Hawks previously competed in the California Pacific Conference (Cal Pac) of the National Association of Intercollegiate Athletics (NAIA) from 1996–97 to 2011–12.

HNU competes in 13 intercollegiate varsity sports: Men's sports include baseball, basketball, cross country, golf, soccer and tennis; while women's sports include basketball, cross country, golf, soccer, softball, tennis and volleyball. Men's volleyball is offered as a club sport. Former NAIA and NCAA teams included men's & women's track & field and Men’s Volleyball

Alumni
 Dame Lydia Dunn, Baroness Dunn, Member of the House of Lords in the United Kingdom, DBE
 Carol A. Corrigan, Associate Justice of the California State Supreme Court
 Belo Cipriani, author of Blind: A Memoir; Cipriani was also Holy Names University's 2012–2014 writer-in-residence.
 Masayoshi Son, Korean-Japanese businessman and the founder and current chief executive officer of SoftBank, the chief executive officer of SoftBank Mobile, and current chairman of Sprint Corporation.
 Anthony Russell, Yiddish singer

See also
 List of colleges and universities in California
 Holy Names High School (Oakland, California)

References

External links
 Official website
 Official athletics website

 
Education in Oakland, California
Universities and colleges in Alameda County, California
Roman Catholic Diocese of Oakland
Educational institutions established in 1868
Schools accredited by the Western Association of Schools and Colleges
1868 establishments in California
Catholic universities and colleges in California
Pacific West Conference schools
Association of Catholic Colleges and Universities
Former women's universities and colleges in the United States
19th century in Oakland, California